Andrew Mathews may refer to:
 Andrew Mathews (Royal Navy officer)
 Andrew Mathews (politician)

See also
 Andrew Matthews (disambiguation)